This is a list of electoral division results for the Northern Territory 2020 general election.

Results summary

Results by electoral division

Arafura

Araluen

Arnhem

Barkly

Blain

Braitling

Brennan

Casuarina

Daly

Drysdale

Fannie Bay

Fong Lim

Goyder

Gwoja

Johnston

Karama

Katherine

Mulka

Namatjira

Nelson

Nightcliff

Port Darwin

Sanderson

Spillett

Wanguri

Notes

References 

Elections in the Northern Territory
Results of Northern Territory elections